Shane Beamer (born March 31, 1977) is an American football coach and former player who is currently the head coach at the University of South Carolina. He is the son of former Virginia Tech football coach Frank Beamer.

Beamer is the highest-paid coach in school history. He is the first South Carolina coach to win back-to-back games against top 10 teams and the first FBS coach since 1978 to win twice by 20+ points as a 20+ point underdog.

Early life
Beamer was born on March 31, 1977 in Charleston, South Carolina to Cheryl (nee Oakley) and Frank Beamer, at the time defensive line coach for the Citadel Bulldogs. In 1987 his father was named head coach of Virginia Tech, and the family moved to Blacksburg, Virginia.  He attended Blacksburg High School where he lettered in both football and baseball, was first-team Group AA all-state receiver, and played in the 1995 Virginia high school all-star football game. He and his wife Emily have three children.

College playing career
In 1995, Beamer chose to walk on as a wide receiver at Virginia Tech—where his father was head coach—over an offer of a partial scholarship from Division I-AA Charleston Southern. Later, he moved to long snapper, the position he played during the Hokies' 1999 season, in which they played for the national championship.

Coaching career

Georgia Tech
Following Beamer's playing career, he became a graduate assistant at Georgia Tech under George O'Leary.  Beamer's team was scheduled to play against his father in the 2000 Black Coaches Association Classic to open the season, but the game was canceled because of lightning and Georgia Tech refused to reschedule it.

Tennessee
From 2001–2003, Shane served as a graduate assistant under Phillip Fulmer at the University of Tennessee.

Mississippi State
In 2004, Beamer was hired by Sylvester Croom at Mississippi State to coach cornerbacks, three of whom earned All-SEC Freshmen honors. In 2006, he assumed the role of recruiting coordinator and brought in a class that included Anthony Dixon, who would go on to play for the San Francisco 49ers and the Buffalo Bills.

South Carolina (assistant coach)
In 2007, Shane was hired by Steve Spurrier at the University of South Carolina to coach outside linebackers and to serve as the special teams coordinator. In 2008, the Gamecock defense finished 2nd in pass defense and 13th in total defense nationally. His 2009 special teams unit blocked five kicks, tying for the SEC lead and ranking eighth in the nation, while the Gamecock defensive unit finished third in the SEC in total defense and fifteenth in the nation.

In his final two years in Columbia, Beamer also served as the recruiting coordinator for the Gamecocks. The 2009 class was ranked 12th best in the nation by Scout.com and Rivals.com and included future NFL Draft picks Stephon Gillmore and Alshon Jeffery. Both the 2010 and 2011 recruiting classes ranked in the top 25 and included future South Carolina stars and NFL players Marcus Lattimore and Connor Shaw.

Virginia Tech
Beamer joined his father in Blacksburg in 2011 as the running backs coach.  In his first year, he coached the school's single season rushing record holder, All-American and ACC Player of the Year, David Wilson.  Wilson was subsequently drafted in the first round by the New York Giants.

Beamer accepted Wake Forest game plan information prior to Virginia Tech's game against the Demon Deacons in 2014.  The information was provided by Demon Deacons radio analyst Tommy Elrod, a former Wake Forest player and assistant coach who was at the center of what became the "Wakeyleaks" scandal.  Virginia Tech eventually lost the game 6–3 in overtime after a 0–0 tie in regulation. The accusations came to light in 2016 when Beamer had moved on to an assistant coach position at the University of Georgia.  Beamer denies providing the information to the coaching staff or players but was fined $25,000 by Georgia for his part in the scandal.

Georgia
Beamer was hired on January 5, 2016 to serve on Kirby Smart's staff as the tight ends coach and special teams coordinator.  He coached several future NFL talents during his stint in Athens, including placekicker Rodrigo Blankenship and tight end Charlie Woerner.

Oklahoma
On January 22, 2018, the University of Oklahoma hired Beamer to be Assistant Head Coach under Lincoln Riley.  Beamer was a part of the staff that coached the nation-leading scoring offense in 2018, where they averaged 48.4 points per game.

South Carolina (head coach)
University of South Carolina athletic director Ray Tanner announced that the school had hired Shane Beamer as its head coach in December 2020. In his first year as head coach, the Gamecocks finished 6-6 in the regular season, with upset wins over Florida and Auburn. The Gamecocks achieved bowl eligibility for the first time since 2018.  Beamer wrapped up the season with a 38-21 victory over North Carolina in the Duke's Mayo Bowl.

On November 26, 2022, South Carolina upset their rival #8 Clemson, ending the Tigers 40-game home winning streak. The previous week, the Gamecocks beat #5 Tennessee making Shane Beamer the only coach in South Carolina history to win back to back games against top 10 teams. The 2022 team finished the regular season with a 8-4 record. South Carolina lost to Notre Dame 45-38 in the Gator Bowl.

Head coaching record

References

External links
 Coaching statistics at Sports-Reference.com
 South Carolina Gamecocks bio
 Oklahoma Sooners bio 

1977 births
Living people
American football long snappers
American football wide receivers
Georgia Bulldogs football coaches
Georgia Tech Yellow Jackets football coaches
Mississippi State Bulldogs football coaches
South Carolina Gamecocks football coaches
Oklahoma Sooners football coaches
Virginia Tech Hokies football coaches
Virginia Tech Hokies football players
Sportspeople from Charleston, South Carolina